Lasanda Rukmal (born 5 September 1990) is a Sri Lankan first-class cricketer who plays for Sri Lanka Air Force Sports Club.

References

External links
 

1990 births
Living people
Sri Lankan cricketers
Sri Lanka Air Force Sports Club cricketers
Colombo Commandos cricketers